Zinovy Aleksandrovich Roizman (11 September 1941 – 6 June 2022) was a Russian film and animation director and screenwriter.

References

External links

1941 births
2022 deaths
Russian animators
Soviet animation directors
Soviet film directors
Russian film directors
Soviet screenwriters
20th-century Russian screenwriters
Male screenwriters
20th-century Russian male writers
Russian people of Ukrainian descent
Recipients of the Medal of the Order "For Merit to the Fatherland" II class
People from Odesa